Free-for-All is the second album by the American singer-songwriter Michael Penn, released in 1992 on RCA Records. It contains two songs that reached the Top 20 on the Modern Rock charts: "Long Way Down (Look What the Cat Drug In)" peaked at number 14, while the second single, "Seen the Doctor", reached nine spots higher. The album led to a bitter battle between Penn and his record company, pushing a follow-up album to 1997.

Critical reception

The Chicago Tribune stated: "Penn is again working with producer Tony Berg, but this time they provide a rich, subtle blending of instruments, harmonies and textures to create an album that doesn't so much pop out as seep in."

In his review for AllMusic, Stewart Mason wrote that it was the record which proved to critics that Penn was no one-hit wonder, calling "Long Way Down" a "dark and pained opening to an album that was hardly pop-star material."

Track listing
All tracks composed by Michael Penn.
"Long Way Down (Look What the Cat Drug In)" – 3:52
"Free Time" – 4:12
"Coal" – 3:33
"Seen the Doctor" – 3:12
"By the Book" – 3:46
"Drained" – 3:59
"Slipping My Mind" – 2:36
"Strange Season" – 3:51
"Bunker Hill" – 4:39
"Now We're Even" – 4:55

Personnel

Musicians
Michael Penn – vocals, guitars
Chris Hickey, Steven Soles, Glenn Tilbrook, Keith Wilkinson – backing vocals
Bennett Chesne – guitars, backing vocals
Gurf Morlix – pedal steel, steel guitar, backing vocals
Tony Berg – harmonica, percussion
Patrick Warren – keyboards
Joel Hirsch – djembe, udu
Wendy Melvoin – trombone
Ron Leonard – cello
John Pierce – bass
Kenny Aronoff, D.J. Bonebrake, Jim Keltner, Ian McHandel Lepine, Pat Mastelotto – drums, percussion

Production
Arranged by Michael Penn
Produced by Michael Penn and Tony Berg
Engineered by Greg Goldman (also assistant engineer), Chris Lord-Alge & Susan Rogers, with assistance by Paul Dieter & Ken Jordan
Mixed by Bob Clearmountain
Mastered by Bob Ludwig

Charts

References

Michael Penn albums
1992 albums
RCA Records albums
Albums produced by Tony Berg